Report Definition Language (RDL)  is a standard proposed by Microsoft for defining reports.

RDL is an XML application primarily used with Microsoft SQL Server Reporting Services. RDL is usually written using Visual Studio, although there are also third-party tools; it may also be created or edited by hand in a text editor. SQL Server Reporting Services or other 3rd party reporting frameworks use RDL to define charts, graphs, calculations, text, images (through links) and other report objects and render them in a variety of formats.

There are three high-level sections in a typical RDL file:
 Page style - The objects to display including fields, images, graphs, tables.
 Field definitions - The extended attributes of fields which are populated with formulas, dynamic data, or Database derived data.
 Parameters and Database connections - Parameters that may be furnished by the user or passed in from another application; and database connections and queries for pulling data into the report.

References

External links 
 Report Definition Language Specification

XML-based standards
Microsoft database software